Psilocybin mushrooms, commonly known as magic mushrooms, are a polyphyletic informal group of fungi that contain psilocybin which turns into psilocin upon ingestion. Biological genera containing psilocybin mushrooms include Psilocybe, Panaeolus (including Copelandia), Inocybe, Pluteus, Gymnopilus, and  Pholiotina. Psilocybin mushrooms have been and continue to be used in indigenous New World cultures in religious, divinatory, or spiritual contexts. Psilocybin mushrooms are also used as recreational drugs. They may be depicted in Stone Age rock art in Africa and Europe but are most famously represented in the Pre-Columbian sculptures and glyphs seen throughout North, Central, and South America.

History

Early

Prehistoric rock art near Villar del Humo in Spain suggests that Psilocybe hispanica was used in religious rituals 6,000 years ago. The hallucinogenic species of the Psilocybe genus have a history of use among the native peoples of Mesoamerica for religious communion, divination, and healing, from pre-Columbian times to the present day. Mushroom stones and motifs have been found in Guatemala. A statuette dating from ca. 200 CE. depicting a mushroom strongly resembling Psilocybe mexicana was found in the west Mexican state of Colima in a shaft and chamber tomb. A Psilocybe species known to the Aztecs as teōnanācatl (literally "divine mushroom": the agglutinative form of teōtl (god, sacred) and nanācatl (mushroom) in Nahuatl language) was reportedly served at the coronation of the Aztec ruler Moctezuma II in 1502. Aztecs and Mazatecs referred to psilocybin mushrooms as genius mushrooms, divinatory mushrooms, and wondrous mushrooms when translated into English. Bernardino de Sahagún reported the ritualistic use of teonanácatl by the Aztecs when he traveled to Central America after the expedition of Hernán Cortés.

After the Spanish conquest, Catholic missionaries campaigned against the cultural tradition of the Aztecs, dismissing the Aztecs as idolaters, and the use of hallucinogenic plants and mushrooms, together with other pre-Christian traditions, was quickly suppressed. The Spanish believed the mushroom allowed the Aztecs and others to communicate with demons. Despite this history, the use of teonanácatl has persisted in some remote areas.

Modern

The first mention of hallucinogenic mushrooms in European medicinal literature was in the London Medical and Physical Journal in 1799: a man served Psilocybe semilanceata mushrooms he had picked for breakfast in London's Green Park to his family. The apothecary who treated them later described how the youngest child "was attacked with fits of immoderate laughter, nor could the threats of his father or mother refrain him."

In 1955, Valentina Pavlovna Wasson and R. Gordon Wasson became the first known European Americans to actively participate in an indigenous mushroom ceremony. The Wassons did much to publicize their experience, even publishing an article on their experiences in Life on May 13, 1957. In 1956, Roger Heim identified the psychoactive mushroom the Wassons brought back from Mexico as Psilocybe, and in 1958, Albert Hofmann first identified psilocybin and psilocin as the active compounds in these mushrooms.

Inspired by the Wassons' Life article, Timothy Leary traveled to Mexico to experience psilocybin mushrooms himself. When he returned to Harvard in 1960, he and Richard Alpert started the Harvard Psilocybin Project, promoting psychological and religious studies of psilocybin and other psychedelic drugs. Alpert and Leary sought to conduct research with psilocybin on prisoners in the 1960s, testing its effects on recidivism. This experiment reviewed the subjects six months later, and found that the recidivism rate had decreased beyond their expectation, below 40%. This, and another experiment administering psilocybin to graduate divinity students, showed controversy. Shortly after Leary and Alpert were dismissed from their jobs by Harvard in 1963, they turned their attention toward promoting the psychedelic experience to the nascent hippie counterculture.

The popularization of entheogens by the Wassons, Leary, Terence McKenna, Robert Anton Wilson, and many others led to an explosion in the use of psilocybin mushrooms throughout the world. By the early 1970s, many psilocybin mushroom species were described from temperate North America, Europe, and Asia and were widely collected. Books describing methods of cultivating large quantities of Psilocybe cubensis were also published. The availability of psilocybin mushrooms from wild and cultivated sources has made them one of the most widely used psychedelic drugs.

At present, psilocybin mushroom use has been reported among some groups spanning from central Mexico to Oaxaca, including groups of Nahua, Mixtecs, Mixe, Mazatecs, Zapotecs, and others. An important figure of mushroom usage in Mexico was María Sabina, who used native mushrooms, such as Psilocybe mexicana in her practice.

Occurrence

In a 2000 review on the worldwide distribution of psilocybin mushrooms, Gastón Guzmán and colleagues considered these distributed among the following genera: Psilocybe (116 species), Gymnopilus (14), Panaeolus (13), Copelandia (12), Pluteus (6) Inocybe (6), Pholiotina (4) and Galerina (1). Guzmán increased his estimate of the number of psilocybin-containing Psilocybe to 144 species in a 2005 review.

Many of them are found in Mexico (53 species), with the remainder distributed throughout Canada and the US (22), Europe (16), Asia (15), Africa (4), and Australia and associated islands (19). Generally, psilocybin-containing species are dark-spored, gilled mushrooms that grow in meadows and woods in the subtropics and tropics, usually in soils rich in humus and plant debris. Psilocybin mushrooms occur on all continents, but the majority of species are found in subtropical humid forests. P. cubensis is the most common Psilocybe in tropical areas. P. semilanceata, considered the world's most widely distributed psilocybin mushroom, is found in temperate parts of Europe, North America, Asia, South America, Australia and New Zealand, although it is absent from Mexico.

Composition
Magic mushroom composition varies from genus to genus and species to species. Its principal component is psilocybin which gets converted into psilocin to produce psychoactive effect. Besides, psilocin, norpsilocin, baeocystin, norbaeocystin, and aeruginascin may also be present, which can modify the effects of magic mushrooms. Panaeolus subbalteatus, one species of magic mushroom, had the highest amount of psilocybin compared to the rest of the fruiting body. Certain mushrooms are found to produce beta-carbolines which inhibit monoamine oxidase, an enzyme that breaks down tryptamine alkaloids. They occur in different genera, such as Psilocybe,Cyclocybe, and Hygrophorus. Harmine, harmane, norharmane and a range of other l-tryptophan-derived β-carbolines were discovered in Psilocybe species.

Effects

The effects of psilocybin mushrooms come from psilocybin and psilocin. When psilocybin is ingested, it is broken down by the liver in a process called dephosphorylation. The resulting compound is called psilocin, responsible for the psychedelic effects. Psilocybin and psilocin create short-term increases in tolerance of users, thus making it difficult to misuse them because the more often they are taken within a short period, the weaker the resultant effects are. Psilocybin mushrooms have not been known to cause physical or psychological dependence (addiction). The psychedelic effects appear around 20 minutes after ingestion and can last up to 6 hours. Physical effects may occur, including nausea, vomiting, euphoria, muscle weakness or relaxation, drowsiness, and lack of coordination.

As with many psychedelic substances, the effects of psychedelic mushrooms are subjective and can vary considerably among individual users. The mind-altering effects of psilocybin-containing mushrooms typically last from three to eight hours, depending on dosage, preparation method, and personal metabolism. The first 3–4 hours after ingestion are typically referred to as the 'peak'—in which the user experiences more vivid visuals and distortions in reality.  The effects can seem to last much longer for the user because of psilocybin's ability to alter time perception.

Sensory
Sensory effects include visual and auditory hallucinations followed by emotional changes and altered perception of time and space. Noticeable changes to the auditory, visual, and tactile senses may become apparent around 30 minutes to an hour after ingestion, although effects may take up to two hours to take place. These shifts in perception visually include enhancement and contrasting of colors, strange light phenomena (such as auras or "halos" around light sources), increased visual acuity, surfaces that seem to ripple, shimmer, or breathe; complex open and closed eye visuals of form constants or images, objects that warp, morph, or change solid colors; a sense of melting into the environment, and trails behind moving objects. Sounds may seem to have increased clarity—music, for example, can take on a profound sense of cadence and depth. Some users experience synesthesia, wherein they perceive, for example, a visualization of color upon hearing a particular sound.

Emotional
As with other psychedelics such as LSD, the experience, or 'trip,' is strongly dependent upon set and setting. Hilarity, lack of concentration, and muscular relaxation (including dilated pupils) are all normal effects, sometimes in the same trip. A negative environment could contribute to a bad trip, whereas a comfortable and familiar environment would set the stage for a pleasant experience. Psychedelics make experiences more intense, so if a person enters a trip in an anxious state of mind, they will likely experience heightened anxiety on their trip. Many users find it preferable to ingest the mushrooms with friends or people familiar with 'tripping.' The psychological consequences of psilocybin use include hallucinations and an inability to discern fantasy from reality. Panic reactions and psychosis also may occur, particularly if a user ingests a large dose. In addition to the risks associated with the ingestion of psilocybin, individuals who seek to use psilocybin mushrooms also risk poisoning if one of the wide varieties of poisonous mushrooms is confused with a psilocybin mushroom.

Dosage

The dosage of mushrooms containing psilocybin depends on the psilocybin and psilocin content, which can vary significantly between and within the same species but is typically around 0.5–2.0% of the dried weight of the mushroom. Usual doses of the common species Psilocybe cubensis range around 1.0 to 2.5 g, while about 2.5 to 5.0 g dried mushroom material is considered a strong dose. Above 5 g is often considered a heavy dose, with 5.0 grams of dried mushroom often being referred to as a "heroic dose".

The concentration of active psilocybin mushroom compounds varies from species to species but also from mushroom to mushroom within a given species, subspecies or variety. The species Psilocybe azurescens  contains the most psilocybin (up to 1.78%).

Toxicology
The species within the most commonly foraged and ingested genus of psilocybin mushrooms, the psilocybe, contains two primary hallucinogenic toxins; psilocybin and psilocin. The median lethal dose, also known as “LD50”, of psilocybin is 280 mg/kg.

From a toxicological profile, it would be incredibly difficult to overdose on psilocybin mushrooms, given their primary toxin compounds. To consume such massive amounts of psilocybin, one must ingest more than 1,200 grams of dried Psilocybe cubensis given 1-2% of the dried mushroom contains psilocybin.

Posing a more realistic threat than a lethal overdose, significantly elevated levels of psilocin can overstimulate the 5-HT2A receptors in the brain, causing acute serotonin syndrome. A 2015 study observed that a dose of 200 mg/kg psilocin induced symptoms of acute serotonin poisoning in mice.

Neurotoxicity-induced fatal events are uncommon with psilocybin mushroom overdose, as most patients admitted to critical care are released from the department only requiring moderate treatment. However, fatal events related to emotional distress and trip-induced psychosis can occur as a result of over-consumption of psilocybin mushrooms. In 2003, a fatal case of magic mushroom poisoning happened when a 27-year-old man was found dead in an irrigation canal due to hypothermia.

Clinical Research 
Due partly to restrictions of the Controlled Substances Act, research in the United States was limited until the early 21st century when psilocybin mushrooms were tested for their potential to treat drug dependence, anxiety and mood disorders. In 2018–19, the Food and Drug Administration (FDA) granted Breakthrough Therapy Designation for studies of psilocybin in depressive disorders.

Legality

The legality of the cultivation, possession, and sale of psilocybin mushrooms and psilocybin and psilocin varies from country to country.

After Oregon Measure 109, in 2020, Oregon became the first US state to decriminalize psilocybin and legalize it for therapeutic use. However, selling psilocybin without being licensed may still attract fines or imprisonment. Current States in the USA where psilocybin mushrooms are decriminalized include Denver, Colorado; Ann Arbor and Detroit, Michigan; Oakland and Santa Cruz, California; Easthampton, Somerville, Northampton, and Cambridge,  Massachusetts; Seattle, Washington; and Washington DC.

Furthermore, buying spores of mushroom species containing psilocybin online in the USA is legal in all states except Georgia and Idaho and California. This is because fruiting mushrooms and mycelium contain psilocybin, a federally banned substance. A technical caveat to consider, however, is that the distributed spores must not be intended to be used for cultivation, but allowed for microscopy purposes.

See also

 List of psilocybin mushroom species
 List of psychoactive plants, fungi, and animals
 Psilocybin decriminalization in the United States

Citations

General and cited references 

 
 
 Haze, Virginia & Dr. K. Mandrake, PhD. The Psilocybin Mushroom Bible: The Definitive Guide to Growing and Using Magic Mushrooms. Green Candy Press: Toronto, Canada, 2016. . www.greencandypress.com.

External links 
 

Entheogens
Psilocybin
Psychedelic tryptamine carriers
Psychoactive fungi